Turtle Island News is a weekly community newspaper, published in Ohsweken, Ontario, Canada. The Turtle Island News also covers First Nation and aboriginal issues across North America.

The Turtle Island News has a circulation of 20,000, according to its website.

The name "Turtle Island News" is a reference to the Turtle Island (North America).

See also
 Tekawennake, discontinued newspaper in Ohsweken, Ontario.
 Two Row Times, weekly publication in Ohsweken, Ontario.

External links
 Turtle Island News Homepage

Weekly newspapers published in Ontario
First Nations newspapers
Publications with year of establishment missing